was a Japanese samurai of the 16th century. Also known as Ishinari Tomomichi (石成友通), he was a senior retainer of the Miyoshi clan. He was one of the three great samurai of the Miyoshi clan called Miyoshi Sanninshu along with Miyoshi Nagayuki and Miyoshi Masayasu. Leading an uprising against the forces of Oda Nobunaga toward the end of his life, Iwanari was killed in battle by Hosokawa Fujitaka.

References

1519 births
1578 deaths
Samurai
Miyoshi clan
Japanese warriors killed in battle